Qeshlaq-e Hajj Lataf Ali (also Romanized as Qeshlāq-e Ḩājj Laṭaf ʿAlī) is a village in Garamduz Rural District, Garamduz District, Khoda Afarin County, East Azerbaijan Province, Iran. At the 2006 census, its population was 54, in 16 families.

References 

Populated places in Khoda Afarin County